William John Blease, Baron Blease JP (28 May 1914 – 16 May 2008) was a British politician.

Blease, the son of William John Blease and Sarah Watts, was educated at McClure Public Elementary School and Belfast Technical College, the National Council of Labour Colleges and then the Workers' Educational Association.

Blease worked first as a shop apprentice from 1929, becoming a grocer's assistant and grocery branch manager between 1938 and 1940. In 1940, he moved to Belfast shipyard, where he stayed as clerk until 1945.  He then became branch manager of the Co-op Society of Belfast until 1959. In 1976, he was appointed as a justice of the peace for Belfast. He was also a member of the British Institute of Management.

An active trade unionist, Blease was elected to the Northern Ireland Committee of the Irish Congress of Trade Unions in 1959, remaining a member until 1975. That year, he joined the Independent Broadcasting Authority, a post he held for four years.

Blease also joined the Northern Ireland Labour Party. He stood unsuccessfully for the Parliament of Northern Ireland in Belfast Oldpark at the 1953 general election, and in 1965 his son William Victor Blease (usually known as Victor) was unsuccessful in Belfast St Anne's.

On 21 June 1978, he was created a life peer with the title Baron Blease, of Cromac in the City of Belfast. From 1979 to 1983, he was Opposition Spokesman on Northern Ireland and Labour Whip. The Queen's University of Belfast made him an honorary doctor of law and the New University of Ulster an honorary doctor of letters.

In 1985, Blease worked with Paddy Devlin to found the Labour Party of Northern Ireland and he remained a trustee of the group until its dissolution in 1990.

Lord Blease married Sarah Evelyn Caldwell in 1939. They had four children, three sons and one daughter. They remained married until his death on 16 May 2008.

See also
 List of Northern Ireland Members of the House of Lords

References

External links
Stratagem: Northern Ireland Peers

1914 births
2008 deaths
Blease of Cromac 
Northern Ireland Labour Party politicians
Irish trade unionists
Life peers created by Elizabeth II